Sahak II Bagratuni (Armenian: Սահակ Բ Բագրատունի), was an Armenian nobleman from the Bagratuni Dynasty. He served as the marzban of Persian Armenia briefly in 482.

Biography
Sahak II was the son of Tirots I Bagratuni, an Armenian aspet. When Tirots died in 451, Sahak II was given the aspet title. In 475, the Mamikonian princess Shushanik, was murdered by her husband Prince Varsken, who was a convert to Zoroastrianism, and was related to the Mihran family. The reason for this murder was because she had refused to convert to Zoroastrianism and wanted to stay Christian. Varsken, because of his actions was in 482 executed by Vakhtang I, king of Iberia. The Sasanian shah Peroz I shortly sent an army to punish Vakhtang for intervening. However, Vakhtang was joined by the Armenians, and a revolt broke out in Armenia, led by Vahan I Mamikonian and Sahak II.

Vahan and Sahak managed to defeat the marzban Adhur Gushnasp, and Sahak was shortly declared by Vahan and the other Armenians as the marzban of Armenia. However, in 482, Peroz sent an army under Shapur Mihran, which defeated the Armenian rebels, killing Sahak. Vahan then fled to the mountains, while Shapur regained control of Armenia. Sahak had a son named Spandiat, who was given the title of aspet after his death.

Sources
 
 
 
 
 

 

5th-century births
482 deaths
Sasanian governors of Armenia
5th-century Iranian people
Bagratuni dynasty
Rebellions against the Sasanian Empire
5th-century Armenian people
5th-century rulers in Asia
5th-century rulers in Europe
Armenian people from the Sasanian Empire